The International Conference on Learning Representations (ICLR) is a machine learning conference typically held in late April or early May each year. The conference includes invited talks as well as oral and poster presentations of refereed papers. Since its inception in 2013, ICLR has employed an open peer review process to referee paper submissions (based on models proposed by Yann LeCun). In 2019, there were 1591 paper submissions, of which 500 accepted with poster presentations (31%) and 24 with oral presentations (1.5%).. In 2021, there were 2997 paper submissions, of which 860 were accepted (29%)..

Locations 
  ICLR 2023, Kigali
 ICLR 2022 (virtual conference)
  ICLR 2021, Vienna, Austria (virtual conference)
  ICLR 2020, Addis Ababa, Ethiopia (virtual conference)
  ICLR 2019, New Orleans, Louisiana, United States
  ICLR 2018, Vancouver, Canada
  ICLR 2017, Toulon, France
 ICLR 2016, San Juan, Puerto Rico, United States
  ICLR 2015, San Diego, California, United States
  ICLR 2014, Banff National Park, Canada
  ICLR 2013, Scottsdale, Arizona, United States

See also 
 ICML
 NeurIPS
 AAAI Conference on Artificial Intelligence

References

External links 
Official website

Artificial intelligence conferences
Signal processing conferences
International conferences in Canada